Leafield Castle (also known as Leafield Barrow) is a motte castle in the village of Leafield in the north west region of Oxfordshire. All that is left of the castle are the earthworks and the earth mound that formed the centre of the castle. The castle is similar in size and shape to the nearby Ascot d'Oilly Castle.

On the opening of a barrow in 1828, some ancient coins were dug up.

The village of Leafield itself is very old and was established by at least the 11th century, but there are few medieval remains and these are limited to features in houses that were later extensively rebuilt. This would mean that there could have been a castle guarding over the village from the 11th century onwards. This castle would have influence over the royal forest of Wychwood, a key centre for hunting as well as royal visits.

See also 

 Castles in Great Britain and Ireland
 List of Castles in England

References 

Castles in Oxfordshire
Scheduled monuments in Oxfordshire
West Oxfordshire District